Martin Quinn was an Irish politician. He was an independent member of Seanad Éireann from 1948 to 1951. He was elected to the 6th Seanad in 1948 by the Agricultural Panel. He lost his seat at the 1951 Seanad election.

References

Year of birth missing
Year of death missing
Irish farmers
Members of the 6th Seanad
Independent members of Seanad Éireann